Mercedes Isabel Pérez Tigreros (born August 7, 1987 in Santa Marta, Magdalena) is a female Colombian weightlifter competing in the 63 kg category until 2018 and 64 kg starting in 2018 after the International Weightlifting Federation reorganized the categories.

Career

Olympics
She competed at the 2008 Summer Olympics in Beijing competing in the 63 kg division. Originally she finished ninth but the original silver medalist Irina Nekrassova failed a doping control and her results were disqualified, as a result, Mercedes got moved up to eight place.

In 2016 she competed at the 2016 Summer Olympics in the 63 kg division finishing fourth overall.

In 2021 she competed at the 2020 Summer Olympics In the 64 kg.

Major results

References

External links
 

1987 births
Living people
Olympic weightlifters of Colombia
Weightlifters at the 2008 Summer Olympics
Weightlifters at the 2016 Summer Olympics
Weightlifters at the 2011 Pan American Games
Sportspeople from Magdalena Department
Colombian female weightlifters
Weightlifters at the 2015 Pan American Games
Female powerlifters
Pan American Games medalists in weightlifting
Pan American Games gold medalists for Colombia
South American Games silver medalists for Colombia
South American Games gold medalists for Colombia
South American Games medalists in weightlifting
Competitors at the 2018 South American Games
Weightlifters at the 2019 Pan American Games
World Weightlifting Championships medalists
Medalists at the 2011 Pan American Games
Medalists at the 2015 Pan American Games
Medalists at the 2019 Pan American Games
Pan American Weightlifting Championships medalists
Weightlifters at the 2020 Summer Olympics
21st-century Colombian women